Harrow International School of Hong Kong is a British international boarding and day, all-through school in Tuen Mun, Hong Kong. When it opened on 3 September 2012, it became the first British boarding school in Hong Kong. It was also the third in the Harrow family of schools in the Asia region in association with Harrow School and The John Lyon School in London. The School provides a British independent style of education from Early Years to Y13.

Background 
The School is built on the site of a former army barracks, in So Kwun Wat, Tuen Mun District in the New Territories. The land was allocated by the Hong Kong government in late 2009. The school pays an annual lease of HK $1,000 for the government land.

Controversy 
In January 2021, it was reported that the school had paid over HK $240,000,000 in fees to a company managed by its board members.

The school

Student composition 
The Lower School begins in the Early Years Centre for students aged 3 and the Upper School ends for students in Y13 aged 18. The student body is very diverse and currently includes 35 different nationalities. The student mix of the School more than fulfils its agreement with the EDB that at least 50% of its admissions will be non-local students who are eligible to study in Hong Kong. The School looks to admit students with the aptitude, ability and personality to thrive in and contribute to its community and the distinctive education it provides. The admissions process has a clear timeline, but applications are considered from strong applicants after the published deadlines, subject to places being available, if they are from overseas and do not have a place in a school in Hong Kong.

Teaching staff 
As of August 2016, the School has 140 teachers and teaching assistants. The majority of the teachers are British; with experience in British independent and state schools, and international schools.

School structure 
The School is divided into five phases of progression under the umbrella of the Lower School (up to and including Y5) and the Upper School (Y6-Y13). 
 The Early Years (K1 and K2) follows the English-based ‘Early Years Foundation Stage’ Curriculum.
 The Pre-Prep School (Y1 to Y5) follows the English-based ‘National Curriculum of England (2014)’.
 The Prep School (Y6 to Y8) offers a skills-based curriculum based on the National Curriculum designed to manage the transition from the homeroom environment in the Pre-Prep School to the more subject-specific environment in the Senior School.
 The Senior School (Y9 to Y11) curriculum is based on IGCSE courses studied over three years.
 The Sixth Form (Y12 to Y13) curriculum is based on A-level courses studied over two years, together with the Extended Project Qualification and the School's own Harrow International Perspectives course.

Language of instruction 
English is the inclusive language of the classroom, playground and boarding Houses for all students irrespective of their mother languages. In addition to English, all students have the option of studying other languages: Mandarin, French and Spanish.

In June 2018 the administration of Harrow Hong Kong decided to only teach simplified Chinese in its kindergarten and primary school Mandarin classes, even though the territory it is located in uses traditional Chinese, on the basis that Hong Kong's environment will be different when 2047, the scheduled end of the special administrative region period, occurs. The school maintained its course despite controversy occurring in Hong Kong.

Boarding 
The School offers the option of boarding from Y6 when students enter the Prep School. Just over 50% of students in the Upper School board, but all students, whether day or boarders, are members of a House and have a House Master or House Mistress who takes responsibility for their pastoral care. The boarding Houses provide rich opportunities for interacting with students from a wide range of backgrounds; there are currently three boys’ and three girls’ Prep Houses (Y6 to Y8), and four boys’ and four girls’ Senior Houses (Y9 to Y13).

The campus 
The campus features a variety of buildings and facilities:

Scholarship and bursary
The School makes available merit-based financial awards for students who are gifted in academic work and/or extra-curricular pursuits where outstanding talent is evident. The aim of the scholarship and bursary programme is to enable the School to draw gifted students from all sections of the global community, irrespective of their parents’ financial circumstances. With bursary supplementation, virtually full remission of fees is available depending on need. Scholarships are available from Y6.

UK governance 
The School operates under an agreement with the Governors of Harrow School in the UK. Two Governors from the Harrow School Board of Governors in the UK are members of the Governing Body; they attend its meetings and visit the School in Hong Kong three times a year to ensure quality control and guidance from the Harrow family.

Parent involvement 
The Friends of Harrow is an association of parents and teaching staff that provides practical support for and assists with additional opportunities to enhance the educational experience for the students and promotes and extends productive relationships within the School community. Its committee and sub-committees have successfully organised external speakers, work placements and Career Fairs for students, as well as major charity fund-raising events.

In addition, each term there are meetings of the Parent Governors consultation group, the Lower School Class Parent, Prep School House and Senior School House Parent committees, in which parent representatives discuss matters of School policy and procedures with members of the senior management. Parent representatives also sit on two focus groups:  the Food Committee and the Transport Committee.

Individual needs support 
The School has a full-time Psychologist, Individual Needs Coordinator and EAP (English for Academic Purposes) Coordinator.

University Destinations and Public Examination results 
Harrow Hong Kong Leavers have been highly successful in gaining places at top universities on competitive courses. In 2016, many of the Year 13 leavers have already confirmed their places at university, with the majority going to the UK. Places accepted and confirmed so far include Cambridge University, Oxford University, London School of Economics. Outside the UK, places have so far been accepted at the University of California, Berkeley; The University of Hong Kong; and at Hong Kong University of Science & Technology.

 A-levels
49 students in Year 13 received 172 A-level grades in examinations in 14 subjects. Seven students received 4A*. Of the grades achieved by the Year 13 cohort, 38.4% were A* grades, 74.8% were A*-A, and 89.9% were A*-B.

 IGCSE
58 students in Year 11 received 600 grades in IGCSE examinations taken in 20 subjects. Of the grades achieved by the Year 11 cohort, 60.0% were A*, 85.2% were A*-A, and 97.5% were A*-B. No grades below C.

School publications 
 "The Hong Kong Harrovian"
 "Scientific Harrovian"

See also
 Britons in Hong Kong
 Consulate General of the United Kingdom in Hong Kong

References

External links 
 

Primary schools in Hong Kong
Secondary schools in Hong Kong
British international schools in Hong Kong
Educational institutions established in 2012
So Kwun Wat
2012 establishments in Hong Kong
Boarding schools in Hong Kong